The 2016 Santiago Challenger was a professional tennis tournament played on clay courts. It was the second edition of the tournament which was part of the 2016 ATP Challenger Tour. It took place in Santiago, Chile between 17 and 22 October 2016.

Singles main-draw entrants

Seeds

 1 Rankings are as of October 10, 2016.

Other entrants
The following players received wildcards into the singles main draw:
  Nicolás Jarry
  Jaume Munar
  Bastián Malla
  Marcelo Tomás Barrios Vera

The following player received entry into the singles main draw using a protected ranking:
  Fabiano de Paula

The following player entered as an alternate:
  Michael Linzer

The following players received entry from the qualifying draw:
  Andrea Collarini
  Daniel Dutra da Silva
  Juan Pablo Ficovich
  Juan Pablo Paz

The following players entered as lucky losers:
  Facundo Mena
  João Pedro Sorgi

Champions

Singles

  Máximo González def.  Rogério Dutra Silva, 6–2, 7–6(7–5).

Doubles

  Julio Peralta /  Horacio Zeballos def.  Sergio Galdós /  Máximo González, 6–3, 6–4.

References

Santiago Challenger